Rasul Amanha Carvalho Dabó (born 14 February 1989) is a Portuguese athlete of Bissau-Guinean descent specialising in the sprint hurdles. He represented his country at the 2014 World Indoor Championships without finishing his heat.

His personal bests are 13.52 seconds in the 110 metres hurdles (+1.0 m/s, La Chaux-de-Fonds 2013) and 7.66 seconds in the 60 metres hurdles (Metz 2014).

International competitions

References

1989 births
Living people
Portuguese male hurdlers
Portuguese people of Bissau-Guinean descent
S.L. Benfica athletes